Thistle is a group of flowering plants.

Thistle may also refer to:

Places
 Thistle, Utah, United States, a ghost town
 Thistle oil field in the North Sea

Arts, entertainment
 The Thistle, a Scottish ladies' step dance
 Thistle TV, a local television station

Businesses
 Thistle Hotels
 Thistle Mining, a corporation once headed by David R. Beatty

People
 Thistle Yolette Harris (1902–1990), Australian botanist and conservationist
 Michael Thistle (born 1980), Australian cricketer
 Thomas Thistle (1853–1936), English clergyman and educator

Association football clubs

Australia
 Port Thistle S.C., originally Port Presbyterian Thistle S.C.

England
 Hereford Thistle F.C.

New Zealand
 Auckland Thistle
 Christchurch Thistle
 Gisborne Thistle
 Huntly Thistle
 Invercargill Thistle also known as Thistle FC
 Nelson Thistle
 Timaru Thistle

Scotland
 Ardeer Thistle F.C.
 Armadale Thistle F.C.
 Bathgate Thistle F.C.
 Buckie Thistle F.C.
 Bunillidh Thistle F.C.
 Burghead Thistle F.C.
 Dalkeith Thistle F.C.
 Dalry Thistle F.C.
 East Kilbride Thistle F.C.
 Ferranti Thistle F.C.
 Forres Thistle F.C.
 Inverness Caledonian Thistle F.C.
 Inverness Thistle F.C.
 Kirriemuir Thistle F.C.
 Largs Thistle F.C.
 Larkhall Thistle F.C.
 Lothian Thistle F.C.
 Lugar Boswell Thistle F.C.
 Meadowbank Thistle F.C.
 Partick Thistle F.C.
 Scone Thistle F.C.
 Strathspey Thistle F.C.
 Thistle F.C.
 Wishaw Thistle F.C., a member of the Scottish Football Union and several other leagues

Watercraft
 , the name of several Royal Navy ships
 , the name of several U.S. Navy ships
 USAHS Thistle, a hospital ship
 Thistle (dinghy)
 Thistle (yacht)

Other uses
 Thistle (color)
 Order of the Thistle, an order of chivalry
 Thistle tube, a piece of laboratory glassware
 Thistles (women's cricket), a women's cricket team from South Africa